Megan Moroney (born October 9, 1997) is an American country music singer. She charted her first single, "Tennessee Orange", in 2022.

Biography
Megan Moroney was born October 9, 1997 in Savannah, Georgia.

She began listening to country music in her childhood and learned to play piano. While attending the University of Georgia, she opened at a concert for Chase Rice, as well as for Kristian Bush of Sugarland. After completing her degree, she moved to Nashville, Tennessee in 2020 to begin a music career. She kept in contact with Bush, which led to him introducing her to other songwriters. She released her first single "Wonder" in 2021, which in turn led to her releasing an extended play titled Pistol Made of Roses. Her next single release was "Tennessee Orange" in 2022, a track on which Bush served as producer.

After the song's release, Moroney received attention on social media for wearing a Tennessee Volunteers shirt belonging to Morgan Wallen; it led to rumors that she was dating him, but Moroney remained neutral when asked if the two were in a relationship. After the song became popular through online streaming, Moroney signed with Columbia Records Nashville.

In late 2022, "Tennessee Orange" debuted at number 94 on the Billboard Hot 100, giving Moroney her first chart entry. At the time, the song also charted on Billboard Hot Country Songs and Country Airplay.

Discography

Albums

Singles

References

Living people
1997 births
American women country singers
Columbia Records artists
Country musicians from Georgia (U.S. state)
People from Savannah, Georgia
21st-century American singers